Mount Urah is a rural locality in the Fraser Coast Region, Queensland, Australia.

History 
The locality takes its name from the mountain in the west of the locality. The mountain takes its name from the Kabi language word euro meaning a species of scrub vine or yurru meaning Flagellaria indica.

Geography
The Mary River forms most of the eastern boundary, while Ooramera Creek forms the north-eastern boundary as it flows to join the Mary. Glenbar National Park is in the west of the locality.

References 

Fraser Coast Region
Localities in Queensland